Badi Ki Dhar also known as Badi Dhar is a holy place situated, near Solan city in Solan district, around  from Shimla in the Indian state of Himachal Pradesh. Badi Dhar is situated at an altitude of 6781 feet above sea level. At the time of Britishers, they surveyed the Badi Dhar to establish Shimla, but people use to say that they were not successful to make is Shimla (due to some reasons or Devta Bara Dev Panch Pandav). Beautiful sights of Shimla as well as Pinjore-Zirakpur road can be seen from the top of the hill. Although only few can spot Pinjore-Zirakpur road from the top of the hill that is also during the nights only. The place is famous for its Lord Shiva temple and annual fair which is organised on 14/15 June. It is expected to rain on the fair day every year, which makes it popular in the whole District. Gathering of around 5,000 to 10,000 people is expected on that day.

History 
Badi dhar was the part of District Mahasu (now Shimla) until 1972 in erstwhile tehsil Arki (Bhagal), later District Solan was formed in 1972 and it merged in district Solan.  It is said that the Pandava spent the last year of their exile at this place in the caves of the hill and forest. A temple dedicated to Lord Shiva is situated here, local people call him BaraDev and the name of this peak is also on his name.  It is said that pandavas visited this place after the battle of "Mahabharta", to atone the curse of killing their own brothers. They went in search of Lord Shiva for MOKSHA. They had been told by "Narad" that Lord Shiva is sitting on the peak of this range in meditation. After knowing the place they went there with a plan to meet Lord Shiva. As per saying Pandavas resided around the peak for eight days and on the ninth day they went to meet Lord Shiva. As they reached the top of mountain Shiva disappeared in a shape of buffalo to Kurukhestra leaving the "dhuni." After that Pandavas erected a temple here dedicated to Lord Shiva and every year people around this dhar recreate the same thing for eight days with Music such as big drums and other local music instruments and on ninth day they go to the peak with their five deities "The Pandavas". As per local saying Pandavas visited this place twice.

Geography 
Peak is highest in District Solan. The place is surrounded by dense forest for 6-8 kilometres in all directions that hosts many birds and animals, such as Monal, leopard, barking deer,Tiger, and vulnerable Himalayan goral are found.
Being at  Badi Dhar enjoys five to seven snowfalls with more than a foot of snow every year and heavy rains in monsoon. Snowcapped mountains(higher ranges above ) can be seen from the top including i.e. Dhauladhar range, middle himalayan ranges i.e. Shikari devi hills (Dist. Mandi ), Kamrunag hill (District. Mandi )), Shali ka tibba ( District. Shimla )) and southern himachal's highest sacred peak Churdhar (District. Shimla/solan/sirmour )).

Infrastructure 
A drivable road goes from Shimla to Badi Ki Dhar. Well connected with road with direct bus from Solan to badi dhar. Place is good for trekking, providing excellent views and freshness due to the presence of Deodar(Ceder) and Ban(Oak). A sarai is built up there for night stay. A helipad is also built there at an altitude of  just  before the temple.

Temples 
The local Hindu temple lies on a hill, and is known for scenic views, including sight of the towns of Himachal and Punjab. These sights are visible from this height.

Festival 
Badi Ki Dhar is known for a fair that is held once every year on 14 June. The fair is dedicated to the worshiping of Lord Shiva including Pandava's. A beautiful Yatra of Pandava is done in the presence of huge numbers of people gathered at this place.

External links 
List of district wise helipads in Himachal Pradesh

Tourist attractions in Shimla